The Macedonian Partisans, officially the National Liberation Army and Partisan Detachments of Macedonia, was a communist and anti-fascist resistance movement formed in occupied Yugoslavia during World War II which participated in the National Liberation War of Macedonia. Units of the army were formed by Macedonians within the framework of the Yugoslav Partisans as well as other communist resistance organisations operating in Macedonia at the time and were led by the General Staff of the National Liberation Army and Partisan Detachments of Macedonia, headed by Mihajlo Apostolski.

History

After the Bulgarian takeover of Vardarska Banovina in April 1941, the Macedonian communists fell in the sphere of influence of the Bulgarian Communist Party.  They thought that the ordinary Macedonian people believe in Bulgaria's role as liberator and that no Macedonian wants to fight against the Bulgarian soldiers. Nevertheless when the USSR was attacked by Nazi Germany in June, some form of anti-Axis resistance started, with the emergence of Macedonian Partisan military units. Initially they had no real success, starting to grow only in 1943 with the capitulation of Italy and the Soviet victories over Nazi Germany. The role of the Bulgarian communists, which avoided organizing mass armed resistance in the area, was also a key factor. Although several Macedonian partisan detachments were formed through the end of 1942 which fought battles against the Bulgarian, Italian, German and Albanian occupation forces and despite Sofia's ill-managed administration, most Macedonian Communists had yet to be lured to Yugoslavia. Between 1941 and 1943,  Tito have sent five emissaries to Macedonia, to persuade his ill-disciplined comrades, but their efforts had limited success, and the Regional Committee of the Communists in Macedonia was de facto under the control of the Bulgarian Communist Party.

To change that, in the beginning of 1943 the Montenegrin Svetozar Vukmanović-Tempo was sent by Tito as an assistant to the HQ of the Macedonian partisan forces. He was supposed to set up a Macedonian Communist Party within the framework of the Yugoslav one. One of his objectives was to destroy the influence of the BCP in Macedonia and to fight against any form of Macedonian autonomism. He would have to "Macedonize" the struggle’s form and content, and to give it an ethnic Macedonian facade. One of his main achievements was also that the wartime pro-Bulgarian trend receded into the background of pro-Yugoslav one. Tempo was able to capitalize on the growing contradictions towards Bulgarian authorities, which during 1942 were involved into a policy of centralization, contradicting their initial agenda to respect Macedonian autonomy. Yugoslav communists proclaimed as their aim the issue of unification of the three regions of Macedonia – Yugoslav, Greek and Bulgarian, and so managed to get also Macedonian nationalists. As result the Communist Party of Macedonia (CPM) was formed on 19 March 1943 in Tetovo. 

The date of the creation of its major unit, the Mirče Acev Battalion, on August 18, 1943 on Mount Slavej between Ohrid and Kičevo, is officially celebrated today in North Macedonia as the Day of the Army of the Republic of North Macedonia. On 11 November 1943, the 1st Macedonian Kosovo Shock Brigade was formed in western Macedonia by merging two Vardar Macedonian and one Kosovo battalion. The second — larger ethnic Macedonian military unit was the 2nd Macedonian Shock Brigade, formed on 22 December 1943 just across the border in Greek Macedonia. On 26 February 1944 in the village of Zegljane, near Kumanovo, the 3rd Macedonian Shock Brigade was formed. These three brigades were the nucleus of the National Liberation Army of Macedonia, which after constant battles became stronger in numbers. From 8,000 partisans in the Summer of 1944, until the final military operations in the Yugoslav National Liberation War in April 1945, the National Liberation Army of Macedonia had increased to three Corps, seven divisions and thirty brigades, all with a total of 100,000 regular soldiers.

Commanders
 Mirče Acev
 Kuzman Josifovski Pitu
 Mihajlo Apostolski
 Metodija Andonov-Čento
 Svetozar Vukmanović-Tempo

Orders of battle

Brigades

1st Macedonian Auto-Brigade
1st Macedonian Cavalry Brigade
1st Aegean Assault Brigade
1st Macedonian Brigade
2nd Macedonian Brigade
3rd Macedonian Brigade
4th Macedonian Brigade
5th Macedonian Brigade
6th Macedonian Brigade
7th Macedonian Brigade
8th Macedonian Brigade
9th Macedonian Brigade
10th Macedonian Brigade
11th Macedonian Brigade
12th Macedonian Brigade
13th Macedonian Brigade
14th Macedonian Brigade Dimitar Vlahov
15th Macedonian Brigade
16th Macedonian Brigade
17th Macedonian Brigade
18th Macedonian Brigade
19th Macedonian Brigade
20th Macedonian Brigade
21st Macedonian Brigade
11th Macedonian Brigade (41st Macedonian Division)
Gotse Delchev Brigade

Corps
15th Corps (operated in Zemun)
16th Corps
Bregalnica-Strumica Corps

Divisions
41st Macedonian Division (General Staff of Macedonia)
42nd Macedonian Division (15th Corps)
48th Macedonian Division (15th Corps)
49th Macedonian Division
50th Macedonian Division
51st Macedonian Division
Kumanovo Division

See also
Military history of North Macedonia
Army of the Republic of North Macedonia

Notes and references
Notes

References

Sources

External links
Macedonia during World War II

Yugoslav Macedonia in World War II
Military units and formations of the Yugoslav Partisans
Anti-fascism in Yugoslavia
Eastern European World War II resistance movements
History of the Socialist Republic of Macedonia
Communism in North Macedonia
Communist organizations in Europe
Guerrilla organizations
Yugoslav Partisans
Paramilitary organizations based in North Macedonia